The Judsonia Community Building Historic District encompasses the W.E. Orr City Park in Judsonia, Arkansas, as well as the community building (a public community resource housing an auditorium and other facilities).  The park, which had been a public park since 1872, was the subject of a federal Works Progress Administration projects during the Great Depression, a project that also included the construction of the Colonial Revival community building.

The district was listed on the National Register of Historic Places in 1991.

See also
National Register of Historic Places listings in White County, Arkansas

References

Historic districts on the National Register of Historic Places in Arkansas
Colonial Revival architecture in Arkansas
Buildings and structures completed in 1939
Geography of White County, Arkansas
National Register of Historic Places in White County, Arkansas
Judsonia, Arkansas